The Lagunari Regiment "Serenissima" is the an active unit of Italian Army's infantry arm's amphibious Lagunari speciality. The name of the specialty comes from the Italian word for lagoon, while the regiment's name "Serenissima" commemorates the Most Serene Republic of Venice. The regiment is based in Venice and assigned to the Cavalry Brigade "Pozzuolo del Friuli". The "Pozzuolo del Friuli" brigade forms, together with the Italian Navy's Third Naval Division and San Marco Marine Brigade, the Italian Armed Forces' Sea Projection Force.

The regiment was formed in 1957 as the Italian Army's amphibious force. Although the Lagunari are the youngest speciality of the Italian Army's infantry, the regiment carries the traditions of the naval infantry of the Republic of Venice, the traditions of the Republic of San Marco's Cacciatori del Sile, the traditions of Royal Italian Army's engineer arm's Lagunari units of World War I, and the traditions of the Amphibious Battalion "Sile".

History

Republic of Venice 
In 1550 the Republic of Venice raised embarked troops for the Venetian fleet, which were named Fanti da Mar (Infantry of the Sea). Present on all Venetian ships the Fanti da Mar were disbanded after the Fall of the Republic of Venice.

Republic of San Marco 
In 1848 the revolutions erupted in the Italian states and in Venice Daniele Manin declared the Republic of San Marco. The cities of the former Republic of Venice raised volunteer units to fight the Austrian forces, which occupied the region. One such force were the Cacciatori del Sile, a light infantry unit formed by the cities of Treviso and Padua and named for the Sile river, which straddles the Venetian Lagoon. On 21 October 1848 the unit moved through the Venetian Lagoon to attack Austrian forces on the Cavallino peninsula. After routing the Austrians the unit returned to its base in Venice-Lido, where on 23 October General Guglielmo Pepe honored the unit with a visit. In 1849 the Austrians subjugated the city and dissolved the Cacciatori del Sile.

Kingdom of Italy 
After the Third Italian War of Independence in 1866 the Austro-Hungarian Empire had to cede what it still held of the Kingdom of Lombardy–Venetia to the Second French Empire, which in turn ceded it to the Kingdom of Italy. With Italy now in possession of Venice it garrisoned the city with Royal Italian Army forces, which included the 14th Sappers Company of the army's Sappers Corps. On 1 January 1874 the corps was split into the 1st Engineer Regiment and 2nd Engineer Regiment. In 1877 the 14th Sappers Company, which was tasked with providing transport for military forces in the Venetian Lagoon, was renamed 14th Lagunari Company.

In 1883 the 2nd Engineer Regiment ceded four Pontieri companies, one train company, and the 14th Lagunari Company in Venice, to help form the 4th Engineer Regiment (Pontieri) in Piacenza. By 1887 the regiment included a Lagunari Brigade, which consisted of the 9th and 10th Lagunari companies, which had been formed by splitting the 14th Lagunari Company. In 1910 the brigades were renamed battalions.

World War I 
During World War I the 4th Engineer Regiment (Pontieri) formed an additional six Lagunari companies, which operated on the extreme right flank of the Italian front in the estuaries of the Isonzo and Timavo river. After the Battle of Caporetto and the Italian retreat to the Piave river the companies operated in the Piave estuary and along the Sile river.

On 28 August 1918 the 8th Engineer Regiment (Lagunari) was formed in Ferrara and all Laguanri companies were transferred to the regiment. The regiment consisted of a command, the I Lagunari Battalion in Venice with the 9th, 15th, 20th, and 23rd company, and the II Lagunari Battalion with the 10th, 21st, 22nd, and 24th company in Ferrara. In October 1918 the regiment formed the 1st Train Company and the same month the regiment's companies were heavily engaged in the Piave delta during the Battle of Vittorio Veneto. In November 1918 the regiment moved to Venice, where it was disbanded on 21 November 1919. The last remaining battalion of the regiment with two Lagunari companies returned on the same date to the 4th Engineer Regiment (Pontieri), which was renamed Pontieri and Lagunari Engineer Regiment.

Interwar years 
On 1 March 1926 the regiment changed its name to Pontieri and Lagunari Regiment. On 15 May 1933 the regiment was split into the 1st Pontieri Regiment (Light Bridges) and 2nd Pontieri Regiment (Heavy Bridges). The 1st Pontieri Regiment was based in Verona and received the II Pontieri Battalion in Verona, IV Pontieri Battalion in Rome, and V Lagunari Battalion in Venice. The new regiment formed these units into two Pontieri battalions, with each battalion also fielding two Lagunari companies. On 1 October 1938 the Lagunari companies were disbanded and their personnel merged into the regiment's bridge companies.

Cold War 
On 15 January 1951 the Italian Armed Forces began the formation of a command in Venice Lido, which was named Lagunari Forces Sector and assigned to the V Army Corps. The command was a mixed Italian Army-Italian Navy formation under the command of navy Counter admiral and tasked to defend the coastal lagoons along the Italian coast in the northern Adriatic Sea: the Venetian Lagoon and the Marano Lagoon. On 1 July 1951 a command platoon with navy and army personnel was formed. On 30 August of the same year the Lagoonal Coast Battalion "Marghera" was formed in Malcontenta. The battalion consisted of a command company with personnel from the army and navy, a truck-transported company with army personnel, an amphibious company with navy personnel, and a lagoonal support unit with navy boats and personnel. On 15 October 1951 the Battalion "San Marco" in Villa Vicentina, which consisted of Navy personnel, but was organized as an army infantry battalion, was transferred from the Infantry Division "Folgore" to the Lagunari Forces Sector.

On 1 September 1952 the Lagoonal Coast Battalion "Piave" was formed in Mestre with the same organization as the Marghera battalion. On 1 January 1954 the landing vehicles and boats of the Lagunari Forces Sector were merged into the Naval Landing Craft Group, which on 15 January 1956 was renamed Naval Vehicles Group. On 1 March 1956 the command of the sector was assigned to a colonel of the Italian Army and the process of detaching the navy component from the sector began. On 1 July the 1957 the Battalion "San Marco" was renamed Lagoonal Coast Battalion "Isonzo" and its enlisted personnel was transferred from the navy to the army.

By 1 September 1957 the Lagunari Forces Sector had lost all navy personnel and was renamed Lagoonal Grouping. The grouping consisted of a command, a command company, a training company, a signal company, the amphibious battalions "Marghera", "Piave", and "Isonzo", the Naval Vehicles Group, and from 1 February 1958 also the Motorized Battalion "Adria", with two reserve truck-transported companies and one active amphibious company. On 1 May 1958 the army formed the Lagoonal Support Unit with armored and amphibious vehicles.

On 25 October 1959 the grouping received its flag and on 24 May 1964 the grouping was reorganized and renamed Lagunari Regiment "Serenissima" and assigned the traditions of the Venetian Fanti da Mar. The regiment now consisted of a command, a command company, the battalions "Marghera", "Piave", and "Isonzo", which were equipped with M113 armored personnel carriers, and the XXII Tank Battalion, which was equipped with M47 Patton tanks and had been formed with the personnel of the Lagoonal Support Unit. In 1964 the Naval Vehicles Group was disbanded and its equipment returned to the navy and each battalion of the regiment formed an amphibious vehicles platoon and a boats platoon. With the amphibious vehicle platoons and the boat platoons of the battalions "Marghera" and "Piave" and the regiment's watercrafts platoon based on the island of Sant'Andrea an Amphibious Transports Company was formed, which was based in Cà Vio and on Sant'Andrea.

During the 1975 army reform the Italian Army disbanded the regimental level and newly independent battalions were granted for the first time their own flags. As first step of the reorganization of the regiment the Battalion "Marghera" in Malcontenta was disbanded on 1 September 1975. On 20 October 1975 the Lagunari Regiment "Serenissima" was disbanded and its personnel used to form the Amphibious Troops Command. On the same date the remaining units of the regiment were reorganized and renamed: the Command Company and Signal Company were merged to form the command's Command and Signal Company. The Battalion "Isonzo" in Villa Vicentina was renamed 41st Mechanized Infantry Battalion "Modena", while and the XXII Tank Battalion in San Vito al Tagliamento was renamed 22nd Tank Battalion "M.O. Piccinini". Both battalions were assigned to the Mechanized Brigade "Gorizia", when that brigade was activated on 1 November 1975. Still on 20 October 1975 the Amphibious Transports Company in Sant'Andrea and Ca' Vio was reorganized and renamed Amphibious Vehicles Battalion "Sile", while the Battalion "Piave" in Mestre was renamed 1st Lagunari Battalion "Serenissima" and assigned the flag and traditions of the Lagunari Regiment "Serenissima". The battalion consisted of a command, a command and services company, three mechanized companies with M113 armored personnel carriers, and a heavy mortar company with M106 mortar carriers with 120mm Mod. 63 mortars.

On 25 October 1975 the flag of the Lagunari Regiment "Serenissima" was transferred to the 1st Lagunari Battalion "Serenissima" in a ceremony on Piazza San Marco in Venice. After the reform the Amphibious Troops Command was assigned to the Mechanized Division "Folgore". When the division was disbanded on 31 October 1986 the command was assigned once again to the 5th Army Corps.

On 25 June 1984 the Lagunari became a distinct speciality within the Italian Army's infantry arm. On 26 August 1984 the Italian Armed Forces' Military Vicar Gaetano Bonicelli declared Saint Mark the Evangelist as patron saint of the new speciality.

Recent times 
On 13 October 1992 the 1st Lagunari Battalion "Serenissima" lost its autonomy and the next day the battalion entered the reformed Lagunari Regiment "Serenissima" as I Lagunari Battalion. The reformed regiment also included the personnel and materiel of the disbanded Amphibious Vehicles Battalion "Sile" and consisted of a command, a command and services company, a naval vehicles company, and the I Lagunari Battalion.

In 2007 the Lagunari Regiment "Serenissima" and the navy's Regiment "San Marco" became part of the Italian Armed Forces' Sea Projection Force. Until 2011 the Lagunari wore the infantry's black beret with a badge of a sea anchor over two rifles, which was replaced in that year by a "lagoon green" beret.

Current structure 

As of 2023 the Lagunari Regiment "Serenissima" consists of:

  Regimental Command, in Mestre
 Command and Logistic Support Company, in Mestre
 1st Lagunari Battalion, in Malcontenta
 1st Lagunari Company "Marghera"
 2nd Lagunari Company "Piave"
 3rd Lagunari Company "Isonzo"
 Maneuver Support Company, in Mestre
 Amphibious Reconnaissance Company, in Mestre
 Amphibious Tactical Support Company, on Vignole Island
 Training Company, in Mestre

The Command and Logistic Support Company fields the following platoons: C3 Platoon, Transport and Materiel Platoon, Medical Platoon, and Commissariat Platoon. The Lagunari companies are equipped with VTLM Lince vehicles and consist of three fusilier platoons and one maneuver support platoon. The Maneuver Support Company consists of a Heavy Mortar Platoon with 120mm mortars, an Anti-tank Platoon with Spike MR anti-tank guided missiles, and a Sniper Section. The Amphibious Tactical Support Company consists of Reconnaissance Platoon, an Amphibious Assault Vehicles platoon with AAV7-A1 amphibious assault vehicles, and a Boat Platoon with small landing craft and speedboats. In the near future the army plans to replace the AAV7-A1 with 82 Amphibious Combat Vehicles.

Regimental Honors 
Military Order of Italy - per Decree of 24 June 2021: for service in Afghanistan: Farah in 2010-2011 and Herat in 2019.

Gold Medal of Army Valour 
Per Decree of 26 April 2007 
The Infantry Regiment participated in the “Ancient Babylon 4” operation in Iraq, included in the Italian Joint Task Force. In that violent theatre it showed military valour and generous altruism. With dedication and enthusiasm, along with ideals of human brotherhood, it carried out humanitarian and support activities in favour of the Iraqi population courageously opposing attacks by the enemy forces. Engaged in the activities for the foundation of the 604th Battalion of the Iraq National Guard, with dedication and determination it participated in the preparation and training of the units of the new Iraqi Army, reaching excellent results recognized by the coalition and local Authorities. In particular, it intervened in the revolts between 5th and 6th August 2004, after the attacks by militiamen along the Euphrates river in the city of Al-Nassiriyah, in order to defend the local Institutions. Extraordinary example of professional capabilities, courage, morality and military virtues, it contributed to increase the prestige of the Army on the international context. (Al-Nassiriyah – Iraq, 5–6 August 2004).

Silver Medal of Army Valour 
Decree of 13 March 2006 
Reminding the traditions of the Marine soldiers, it was engaged in several rescue operations in favour of the civilian population hit by natural disasters but also in international rescue operations. In those circumstances, the personnel of the Regiment showed expertise, great sense of duty, spirit of sacrifice and courage in carrying out dangerous activities thanks to which it earned gratitude and admiration by the rescued operations and esteem by all the contingents of the other Nations that operated in international missions. Great example of civic and military virtues, courageous altruism and high professionalism that increased the prestige of the Italian Army on the international context. (National territory and Balkan theatre, 1951–2003).

Silver Cross of Army Merit
Decree 27 July 2009 
Included in the "Joint Task Force – Lebanon" and heir of the glorious traditions of the "Fanti da Mar" of the "Serenissima" Republic of Venice, the Infantry Regiment was employed in the Lebanese Operational Theatre, in a region characterized by continuous instability and conflict. With the determination and the enthusiasm of its soldiers, it gave important contribution in the peacekeeping operations. Thanks to its dedication and enthusiasm, supported by human brotherhood, it was a protagonist in the humanitarian and support activities in favour of the local population. Since the beginning of the operations, its marines have been the protagonist also in the construction of the "United Nations 2-1" base in Mara'ka, giving example of professionalism and sense of duty. The "Serenissima" Marines Regiment contributed to increase the prestige of Italy and of the Army on the international context. (Shama – Lebanon, 9 November 2006 – 13 April 2007).

See also 
 Italian Navy: San Marco Marine Brigade

References

External links
Italian Army Website: Reggimento Lagunari "Serenissima"

Regiments of Italy
Marine regiments
Italian Marines